Istituto Italo-Brasiliano Biculturale Fondazione Torino or  Fundação Torino is an Italian international school in , Belo Horizonte, Brazil. The school serves the following levels: Scuola Materna/Educação Infantil, Scuola Elementare/Esino Fundamental I, Scuola Media/Esino Fundamental II, and Scuola Superiore/Ensino Médio.

See also

 Italian Brazilian

References

External links
 Fundação Torino
  Fundação Torino
  Fundação Torino

Italian international schools in Brazil
Belo Horizonte